A Roman Scandal was a synthpop band from Austin, Texas active from 1999 through 2001.  Members included Tyler Jacobsen (1977-2019) (from Denim and Diamonds and OMD 20/20), Sean O'Neal (from the Arm and This Microwave World, and currently a writer for The Onion's A.V. Club), Chris Bultman (from the Daniel Johnston Band, Jad Fair, This Microwave World, and Denim and Diamonds), Alex Killough (from OMD 20/20), and Jason Reece (from ...And You Will Know Us by the Trail of Dead).

External links
 aRomanScandal.org - Old Domain
 A Roman Scandal interview
 Media organization run by Tyler Jacobsen, contains links to Denim and Diamonds and other artwork
 Personal site of Alex Killough, contains some OMD 20/20 songs and other music and artwork

American pop music groups
American synth-pop groups
Musical groups established in 1999
Musical groups disestablished in 2001
1999 establishments in Texas